The 1953 season was Dinamo București's fifth season in Divizia A. For the third year in a row, Dinamo ends the championship in the second place, three points from the champions CCA Bucharest. Titus Ozon won for the second consecutive year the Division A top scorer with 12 goals this season.

Games from rounds 9 to 11 were played in Bucharest because of a decision made by Football Central Committee, in order to see all the players for the national team. Thus, the match between Ştiinţa Cluj and Dinamo, originally scheduled in Cluj-Napoca, held in Bucharest.

The game between Dinamo and Casa Armatei Câmpulung Moldovenesc, in the 16th round, never took place, the Bucovina club being disbanded, following a decision taken by the Republican Association CCA to have only one representative in football (in this case CCA Bucharest).

Results

Squad 

Standard team: Iosif Fuleiter (Constantin Constantinescu) – Iosif Szökő, Ladislau Băcuț, Florian Ambru (Anton Fodor) – Gheorghe Băcuț, Valeriu Călinoiu (Viliam Florescu) – Dan Ion Sârbu (Nicolae Voinescu), Carol Bartha, Ion Suru, Nicolae Dumitru, Titus Ozon (Alexandru Ene).

At the end of the first half of the season, coach Iuliu Baratky left the club and was replaced by Angelo Niculescu.

Transfers 

Since the transfers were discouraged by the Federation, Dinamo has a few players during the inter-competitive, only five players from Dinamo Orasul Stalin, which included Nicolae Voinescu.

References 
 www.labtof.ro
 www.romaniansoccer.ro

1953
Association football clubs 1953 season
1953–54 in Romanian football
1952–53 in Romanian football